Clyde Williams may refer to:
 Clyde Williams (American football) (1879–1938), American football player and coach
 Clyde Williams (baseball) (1920–2005), American Negro league baseball player
 Clyde Williams (Missouri politician) (1873–1954), U.S. Representative from Missouri
 Clyde Williams (New York politician), candidate for Congress in New York's 13th Congressional District